The men's 100 metres event at the 2021 European Athletics U23 Championships was held in Tallinn, Estonia, at Kadriorg Stadium on 8 and 9 July.

Records
Prior to the competition, the records were as follows:

Results

Round 1
Qualification rule: First 2 in each heat (Q) and the next 2 fastest (q) advance to the Final.

Wind:Heat 1: +1.3 m/s, Heat 2: +1.6 m/s, Heat 3: +1.0 m/s

Final

Wind: –0.3 m/s

References

100 metres
100 metres at the European Athletics U23 Championships